Pere Koroba (born 9 May 1981) is an Indonesian rower. She competed in the women's single sculls event at the 2004 Summer Olympics.

References

1981 births
Living people
Indonesian female rowers
Olympic rowers of Indonesia
Rowers at the 2004 Summer Olympics
People from Jayapura